Winchester is an unincorporated census-designated place in the town of Winchester in Winnebago County, Wisconsin, United States. The community is located less than 1 mile (1 kilometer) from the southern intersection of U.S. Route 10 and U.S. Route 45. Wisconsin Highway 150 passed east–west through the community until the road was decommissioned by the state of Wisconsin, the road is now designated County Highway II. It has an elevation of 846 feet above mean sea level at latitude 44.199 and longitude -88.665. As of the 2010 census, its population is 671.

Notable people
 The Norwegian-American writer Peer Stromme was born in Winchester.
The demographics, according to the 2020 Census, place the population at 99.4% Caucasian, there are no known African American or Native American inhabitants, but the population is believed to be 0.6% Pacific Islander or Asian American, more than one race, or "Other" racial categories.

References

Census-designated places in Winnebago County, Wisconsin
Census-designated places in Wisconsin